Sarah Lucy Thompson (née Gentile; died August 23, 2010) was a Canadian athlete and powerlifter. Throughout her career, Thompson set multiple records in powerlifting and athletics. She was inducted into the Belleville Sports Hall of Fame in 1987 and the Terry Fox Hall of Fame in 2000.

Early life and education
Thompson was born in Picton, Ontario.

Career
In 1974, Thompson had a stroke that resulted in paralysis and low vision. After she became visually impaired, Thompson started her sports career in 1978. She first became a track and field athlete and participated at the Games for the Physically Disabled. Thompson expanded her sports career to powerlifting in 1984. As a powerlifter, she won ten Canadian powerlifting championships. Thompson was named the Best Athlete of the Year by the Ontario Blind Sports Association in 1987 and won a gold medal at the 1991 World Championship for the Blind.

Throughout her career, Thompson set Canadian and world records in both athletics and powerlifting for blind sports. In 1982, she set multiple Canadian records in athletics including the 100 m dash, shot put and long jump. Alternatively, Thompson broke various powerlifting world records in the deadlift and bench press.

Awards and honours
In 1987, Thompson was inducted into the Belleville Sports Hall of Fame and later named to the Terry Fox Hall of Fame in 2000. Medals that Thompson were awarded include a legacy award for the International Year of Older Persons and the 125th Anniversary of the Confederation of Canada Medal.

Personal life
Thompson married in 1949 and had two kids.

Death
On August 23, 2010, Thompson died at Belleville General Hospital.

References

2010 deaths
Visually impaired track and field athletes
Canadian female track and field athletes
Canadian powerlifters
Canadian Disability Hall of Fame
Year of birth uncertain